Mumbaicha Dabewala is a Marathi movie released on 28 December 2007. Produced by Mukund Vitkar and directed by Manohar Sarvankar.

Cast 
 Vijay Chavan
 Bharat Jadhav
 Deepali Saiyyed
 Smita Gondkar
 Madhu Kambikar

Soundtrack
The music is provided by Ram Laxman.

References

External links 
  Movie Review - cinema-baghu-ya.blogspot.in
 Movie Review - gomolo.com
 Movie Details - filmorbit.com

2007 films
Films set in Mumbai
2000s Marathi-language films